Dr. William E. Newell (died 1976) was an author and "noted authority on power electronics". He worked at the Westinghouse Research and Development Center in Pittsburgh.

Influence
The William E. Newell Power Electronics Award was created in 1977 by the Power Electronics Society, and in 2005, the IEEE established another award in his name, this one called the IEEE William E. Newell Power Electronics Award.

Works
Motto, Jr., John William, (editor), Introduction to Solid State Power Electronics, Westinghouse Electric Corporation, Semiconductor Division, Youngwood, PA 15697, 1977. 143 p. edited from the posthumous notes of William E. Newell

Footnotes

References
IEEE William E. Newell Power Electronics Award
Past Recipients of the PELS Newell Award

1976 deaths
American electronics engineers
Year of birth missing